Kim Pung-il is a North Korean former footballer. He represented North Korea on at least twelve occasions between 1986 and 1989, scoring five times.

Career statistics

International

International goals
Scores and results list North Korea's goal tally first, score column indicates score after each North Korea goal.

References

Date of birth unknown
Living people
North Korean footballers
North Korea international footballers
Association football midfielders
Year of birth missing (living people)